Kathal Hil Patribal is a village in Boniyar Tehsil in the Baramulla district of Jammu and Kashmir, India. It is located close to the town of Uri.

Demographics  
As of the 2011 Census of India, the population of the village is 1,283 with 660 males and 623 females. Children who are from 0–6 years old made up 17.61%,  of the population.  Literacy rate was 57.52% with male literacy rate at 74.73% and female literacy rate at 38.86%.

References 

Villages in Baramulla district